Dehaasia is a genus of evergreen or deciduous trees or shrubs belonging to the laurel family, Lauraceae, with 53 species native to continental Asia, from India to China, and islands of Borneo, New Guinea, and Indonesia.

They are hermaphroditic shrubs, or trees of medium size up to 5 m tall. in tropical montane forest, lowland rainforest, subtropical coastal lowland rainforest, cloud forest, and laurel forest.
About 38 accepted species are found in Cambodia, China, Indonesia, Laos, Malaysia, Myanmar, the Philippines, Thailand, and Vietnam, with the center of diversity in west Malaysia; three species occur in China, two endemic.
Alseodaphne, Dehaasia and Nothaphoebe are, morphologically, three closely related but different genera in a subgroup near to genus Persea.

The leaves are bright green to dark green, alternate, oblong to lanceolate to almost elliptical, acuminate, and slightly cut at the base. They are leathery in texture, glossy on both sides, dark green on the upper face more intense, sometimes with small blisters on the underside.

The trunk is rough and irregular, covered  usually with a paper bark, whitish or gray, smooth and easy to peel, with the xylem yellow.  Some species with multiple stems or trunks are strongly branched from the base. The young branches are slender, angular, smoothly integumented, with visible signs of scars and sometimes reddish areas of recent growth.  The branchlets are yellow-white at first, but a little gray later, thin, glabrous, warty, lenticellated with distinctive leaf scars, the young more or less angled.
 
The leaves are grouped at the tip of the twigs. The inflorescences form in the axils, are generally thin with many bracts and few flowers, usually upright and branched at right angles. Dehaasia species have "perfect flowers", possessing both male and female parts.

The oblong fruit, hard or fleshy, are conformed to attract animals and frequently are brightly colored with sometimes a thickened, strikingly colored stem at the junction of the peduncle part with the fruit.
The fruit is black-dark and shiny, generally scarlet, but sometimes yellow or green. Usually ovoid, rarely globose with a fleshy and meaty  exocarp. Some species have a red or scarlet dome.  Seed dispersal of Dehaasia species is by vertebrates mostly. They are eaten by frugivorous bats and birds (columbiformes) and several insects such as ants.

Species
Some names in the repository Global Names Index of uBio:
Dehaasia acuminata  	Koord. & Valeton	
Dehaasia annamensis 	Kosterm.
Dehaasia assamica 	Kosterm.	
Dehaasia borneensis 	Fern.-Vill.	
Dehaasia brachybotrys 	(Merr.) Kosterm.
Dehaasia caesia Blume.
 Dehaasia cairocan (Vidal) C.K. Allen.
 Dehaasia candolleana (Meisn.) Kosterm.
 Dehaasia celebica Kosterm.
 Dehaasia corynantha Kosterm.
 Dehaasia cuneata Dehaasia firma Dehaasia gigantocarpa Dehaasia hainanensis Dehaasia hirsuta Dehaasia incrassata Dehaasia kerrii Dehaasia kurzii Dehaasia kwangtungensis Dehaasia lancifolia Dehaasia longipedicellata Dehaasia longipetiolata Dehaasia membranacea Dehaasia nitida Dehaasia palembanica Dehaasia paradoxa Dehaasia pauciflora Dehaasia polyneura Dehaasia purpurea Dehaasia rangamattiensis Dehaasia subcaesia Dehaasia suborbicularis Dehaasia sumatrana Dehaasia sumbaensis Dehaasia teijsmannii Dehaasia titanophylla Dehaasia tomentosa Dehaasia turfosa Dehaasia velutinosa''

References

External links

 A synopsis of the genus Dehaasia Bl. (Lauraceae)
 Chemical constituents from Dehaasia triandra. 1. Three new alkaloids, isocorydione, norisocorydione, and dehatriphine, from the leaves
 Chemical constituents from Dehaasia triandra. II. Five new alkaloids, secoxanthoplanine, dehydroisocorydione, 11, 8′-O-bisisocorydine,(8, 8′-R)-and (8, 8′-S)

Lauraceae genera
Lauraceae